The following page lists hydroelectric power stations that generate power using the run-of-the-river method.

Hydroelectric power stations

This table lists currently operational power stations. Some of these may have additional units under construction, but only current net capacity is listed.

Under construction 
This table lists stations under construction or operational stations with under-construction and current net capacity over 100 MW.

See also

 List of largest power stations in the world
 List of pumped-storage hydroelectric power stations
 List of hydroelectric power station failures

References

Hydroelectric
Run of the river